Jason Knight may refer to:

Jason Knight (fighter) (born 1992), American featherweight mixed martial artist and bare-knuckle boxer
Jason Knight (footballer) (born 2001), Irish footballer
Jason Knight (wrestler) (born 1963), American professional wrestler and manager
Jason Knight, ABS Master Smith and judges for season 3 of Forged in Fire (TV series)

See also
Knight (surname)